Michael Maien is a German film and television actor.

Selected filmography
 The Blood of the Walsungs (1965)
 Once a Greek (1966)
 Forty Eight Hours to Acapulco (1967)
 Take Off Your Clothes, Doll (1968)
  (1969, TV film)
 Mark of the Devil (1970)
 Hotel by the Hour (1970)
 Eye in the Labyrinth (1972)
 Emanuelle Meets the Wife Swappers (1973)
 2069: A Sex Odyssey (1974)

References

Bibliography
 John Kenneth Muir. Horror Films of the 1970s. McFarland, 2002.

External links
 

1947 births
Living people
German male film actors
German male television actors
20th-century German male actors